Helen Deutsch (21 March 1906 – 15 March 1992) was an American screenwriter, journalist, and songwriter.

Biography
Deutsch was born in New York City and graduated from Barnard College. She began her career by managing the Provincetown Players. She then wrote theater reviews for The New York Herald-Tribune and The New York Times, as well as working in the press department of the Theatre Guild.

Her first screenplay was for The Seventh Cross (1944), based on Anna Seghers's 1942 novel of the same name. She adapted Enid Bagnold's novel, National Velvet into a screenplay that became a famous film (1944) starring Elizabeth Taylor. After writing a few films (Golden Earrings (1947), The Loves of Carmen (1948) and Shockproof (1949) ) for Paramount and Columbia Pictures, she spent the greater part of her career working for Metro-Goldwyn-Mayer.

There, she wrote the screenplays for such films as King Solomon's Mines (1950), Kim (1950), It's a Big Country (1951), Plymouth Adventure (1952), Lili (1953), Flame and the Flesh (1954), The Glass Slipper (1955), I'll Cry Tomorrow (1955), Forever, Darling (1956) and The Unsinkable Molly Brown (1964).

Her last screenplay was for 20th Century Fox's Valley of the Dolls (1967).

Lili

Deutsch got the idea for Lili from a Paul Gallico short story, and cast Leslie Caron after seeing the rushes for An American in Paris.

As part of her work for Lili, Deutsch wrote the lyric of the song Hi-Lili, Hi-Lo, which has been a popular bittersweet ballad for cabaret singers ever since.  Branislau Kaper composed the music for it and the song was sung by Leslie Caron on the movie soundtrack.

In 1961, the Broadway version of the musical Carnival! was based on Lili and starred Anna Maria Alberghetti. Deutsch attempted to write the libretto, but was replaced by Michael Stewart. The show was nominated for two Tony awards.

Deutsch was nominated for the Academy Award for the screenplay of Lili, which also won her a Golden Globe Award.

Shortly after Helen's Barnard graduation, she was asked to write something to recite on a radio show to be aired just two days later in honor of the late actress Jane Cowl. Overnight, Helen wrote "The White Magnolia Tree." She then forgot about the poem. In 1957, she was commissioned by NBC-TV to provide a poem to be recited by Helen Hayes for the 50th anniversary celebration of General Motors. She got out her old poem, and Helen Hayes recited it with such tenderness that within a week thousands of people had requested a copy of the poem. General Motors provided it in booklet form. Helen Hayes herself made a 45 rpm of the poem and sent out hundreds of copies. It was released in Australia as His Master's Voice catalogue EA 52001.

In Australia, the Helen Hayes version was superseded when Gay Kayler (Gay Kahler) recorded her version of The White Magnolia Tree with a lush 32-piece orchestral backing.  This became Gay's signature tune and remained in EMI and Reader's Digest catalogues (appearing on the Family Favourites box set) for more than 33 years.

Helen Deutsch died in New York City of natural causes.

References

External links
 

1906 births
1992 deaths
Jewish American songwriters
American women screenwriters
Barnard College alumni
Writers from New York City
Songwriters from New York (state)
20th-century American musicians
Screenwriters from New York (state)
20th-century American women writers
20th-century American screenwriters
20th-century American Jews